The 2002–03 USHL season is the 24th season of the United States Hockey League as an all-junior league. The regular season began on September 27, 2002, and concluded on March 30, 2003, with the regular season champion winning the Anderson Cup. The 2002–03 season was the first for the River City Lancers after relocating to Council Bluffs, Iowa, from Omaha, Nebraska, and the last for the Topeka ScareCrows, which relocated to Chesterfield, Missouri, after the season concluded.

The Clark Cup playoffs features the top eight team from the eleven-team league regardless of division competing for the league title.

Regular season
Final standings

Note: GP = Games played; W = Wins; L = Losses; OTL = Overtime losses; SL = Shootout losses; GF = Goals for; GA = Goals against; PTS = Points; x = clinched playoff berth; y = clinched division title; z = clinched league title

East Division

West Division

Clark Cup playoffs

Players

Scoring leaders

Leading goaltenders

Awards
Coach of the Year: P.K. O'Handley Waterloo Black Hawks
Curt Hammer Award: Jake Taylor Green Bay Gamblers
Defenseman of the Year: Matt Carle River City Lancers
Forward of the Year: Ryan Potulny Lincoln Stars
General Manager of the Year: P.K. O'Handley Waterloo Black Hawks
Goaltender of the Year: Dominic Vicari River City Lancers
Organization of the Year: Waterloo Black Hawks
Player of the Year: Ryan Potulny Lincoln Stars
Rookie of the Year: Joe Pavelski Waterloo Black Hawks

References

External links
 Official website of the United States Hockey League

USHL
United States Hockey League seasons